Danish Taimoor (born 16 February 1983) is a Pakistani actor and model. He began his career in 2005 and appeared in "Mystery Series" (Do saal baad, Dracula); both episodes were directed by Imran khokhar and aired on Indus Vision. He is notable for his role in Urdu drama series' and telefilms in Pakistan. Notable dramas include Haseena Moin's Meri Behen Maya, Mannchalay, Jab we Wed, Shert, Sari Bhool Humari thi, Deewangi, Ishq Hai and Mehreen Jabbar's Rehai. He made his film debut in Jalaibee in March 2015, directed by Yasir Jaswal.

Early life and career
Taimoor was born in Karachi, Pakistan. On 8 August 2014, he married actress Ayeza Khan after being in relationship with her for 7–8 years. Taimoor started working as a model before moving on to acting. Taimoor while talking to Maria Wasti at Croron Mein Khel-Bol TV on 25 March 2020  revealed that he met Ayeza Khan 1st time on Social Networking Website Orkut & Ayeza introduced herself as his fan since Danish was already doing Play Serials by then & they used to know each other since then.
Taimoor began his television career in Mystery Series (Do saal baad, Dracula) which was aired on Indus Vision and was Directed by Imran Khokhar. Then Danish appeared with a small appearance in "Dil Diya Dehleez" (2009). Some of his notable works include Massi Aur Malika, Chudween Ka Chand, Mannchalay, Kuch Unkahi Batain, Koi Jane Na, Baji, Larkiyan Muhalley Ki and Lamha Lamha Zindagi. He also appeared in telefilms including Pappu Ki Padoosan, Neeli Chatri, Love Hit Tou Life Hit, Haseena Maan Jaye Gi, and Piano Girl.

Filmography

Films

Television

Host
Game Show Aisay Chalega

Telefilms
 Pappu Ki Padoosan
 Neeli Chatri
 Love Hit Tou Life Hit
 Haseena Maan Jaye Gi
 Jo Hara Wo Sikandar
 Kya Pyar Ho Gaya (2019)
 Piano Girl
 Teri Meri Love Story

Awards and accolades 

|-
| 2016
| Best Lead Actor in a Film / Wrong No.
| rowspan="3"|Lux Style Awards
| 
|-
| 2021
| Best TV Actor-Viewer's choice / Deewangi
| 
|-
|2022
|Best TV Actor-Viewers' Choice / Ishq Hai
|
|}

References

External links 

1983 births
Living people
Pakistani male models
Male actors from Karachi
Pakistani male television actors
University of Karachi alumni